Dorothy Anne Gordon (born 24 December 1941) played nine Women's Test matches and eight Women's one-day internationals for Australia. She was the captain of the Australian Women's Cricket Team in 1976. She was the first fielder to take three catches in a Women's Cricket World Cup match.

Gordon lived and grew up in Moe, Gippsland, Victoria. After retiring from playing she became a selector for the Victoria Women's Cricket Association, Surrey and then England Selector and Chairwoman of England Selectors from 1992 to 1996. She was awarded life membership of Cricket Victoria in 2018.

References

External links
 Ann Gordon at southernstars.org.au

1941 births
Living people
Australia women Test cricketers
Australia women One Day International cricketers
Victoria women cricketers
Cricketers from Victoria (Australia)
People from Moe, Victoria